Johnson Morrow House is a historic home located at Callao, Macon County, Missouri.  It was built about 1912, and is a two-story, Queen Anne style frame dwelling. The house measures 37 feet by 49 feet and is cubic in shape. It has a complex hipped roof, large side bays, and a full front porch.

It was listed on the National Register of Historic Places in 1994.

References

Houses on the National Register of Historic Places in Missouri
Queen Anne architecture in Missouri
Houses completed in 1912
Houses in Macon County, Missouri
National Register of Historic Places in Macon County, Missouri